Since the 1968 Summer Olympics did not feature tennis as an official sport, two unofficial tournaments were held during the Games: a Demonstration tournament and an Exhibition tournament.

The Demonstration tournament was played from 14 to 20 October 1968 at three venues in Guadalajara, Mexico: Guadalajara Country Club, Atlas Sports Club and Guadalajara Sports Club; all of them featured clay courts. All matches were played at best-of-three sets; since the tiebreak rule wasn't implemented until the 1970s, a player had to win a set by a two-game margin in case of a 6–6 draw.

West German Helga Niessen won the tournament by defeating American Peaches Bartkowicz 6–4, 6–3 in the final.  Another American, Julie Heldman, won the third place.

Seeds
Both seeds received a bye into the quarterfinals.

Draw

Bronze-medal match

References

External links
 Official Results Archive (ITF)

Demonstration
Women's events at the 1968 Summer Olympics
Olym